Hudiesaurus (meaning "butterfly lizard") is a herbivorous sauropod genus of dinosaur from China. Its fossil remains were found in 1993 by a Chinese-Japanese expedition near Qiketai in Shanshan, Xinjiang province. The genus contains a single species, Hudiesaurus sinojapanorum, was named and described by Dong Zhiming in 1997. The generic name is derived from Mandarin hudie, meaning "butterfly," and refers to a flat butterfly-shaped process on the front base of the vertebral spine. The specific name refers to the members of the Sino-Japan Silk Road Dinosaur Expedition but can also be read as "central part" in Chinese, a pun on the Japanese Chunichi Shinbun (again "central part") press group, which financed the research.

Discovery 
Hudiesaurus is known from only two incomplete specimens, uncovered within sediments in the Turpan Basin equivalent to the Kalazha Formation of the Junggar Basin, which perhaps dates to the late Jurassic Period. The type specimen (IVPP V 11120) is represented only by a very large posterior cervical vertebra. This specimen, IVPP P. 11121, consisting of a nearly complete right front leg and teeth, was referred to Hudiesaurus by Dong. In 2004, Paul Upchurch rejected this proposal because of a lack of overlapping material. Upchurch et al. made the specimen the holotype of a new genus, Rhomaleopakhus, in 2021.

Description 

Classification 
In the original description, Dong thought Hudiesaurus may have been related to Mamenchisaurus and accordingly placed it in the Mamenchisauridae. In 2004, Upchurch limited the precision to a more general Eusauropoda. In the 2021 description of Rhomaleopakhus, the relationships of Hudiesaurus were again revised. In their phylogenetic analysis, Upchurch et al. proposed that Hudiesaurus was a member of the Mamenchisauridae, as a sister taxon to two Mamenchisaurus species (M. youngi and a referred specimen of M. hochuanensis) and Xinjiagtitan, as well as a clade containing the holotype of M. hochuanensis and Klamelisaurus. Their cladogram is shown below:

References

External links
 "How big was Hudiesaurus?" Sauropod Vertebra Picture of the Week, January 17, 2008

Late Jurassic dinosaurs of Asia
Mamenchisaurids
Taxa named by Dong Zhiming
Fossil taxa described in 1997
Paleontology in Xinjiang